European route E65 is a north-south Class-A European route that begins in Malmö, Sweden and ends in Chania, Greece.

Route 

: Malmö – Ystad
Gap (Baltic Sea)
  Ystad -  Świnoujście

: Świnoujście - Troszyn
: Troszyn - Goleniów
: Goleniów (start of concurrency with )  - Rzęśnica
: Rzęśnica - Klucz, Szczecin (end of concurrency with )
: Klucz, Szczecin – Gryfino – Pyrzyce – Myślibórz – Gorzów Wielkopolski – Skwierzyna – Międzyrzecz – Jordanowo – Świebodzin – Zielona Góra – Nowa Sól - Legnica - Polkowice - Lubin - Jawor - Bolków
: Bolków - Jelenia Góra - Jakuszyce, Szklarska Poręba

: Harrachov – Železný Brod – Turnov
: Turnov - Prague
: Prague
: Prague (start of concurrency with  ) - Humpolec - Jihlava (End of Concurrency with ) - Brno (end of concurrency with )
: Brno - Břeclav

: Brodské - Bratislava (start of concurrency with )

: Rajka - Mosonmagyaróvár
: Mosonmagyaróvár (end of concurrency with )
: Mosonmagyaróvár - Csorna - Hegyfalu
: Hegyfalu - Szombathely
: Szombathely - Körmend - Nádasd
: Nádasd - Zalaegerszeg
: Zalaegerszeg
: Zalaegerszeg - Nagykanizsa
: Nagykanizsa (start of concurrency with ) - Letenye

: Goričan - Zagreb
: Zagreb (concurrency with  within it)
: Zagreb - Karlovac - Bosiljevo (end of concurrency with )
: Bosiljevo - Rijeka
: Rijeka - Kraljevica
: Kraljevica - Senj
: Senj - Žuta Lokva
: Žuta Lokva (start of concurrency with ) - Zadar - Split (end of concurrency with ) - Mali Prolog 
: Mali Prolog - Ploče 
: Ploče - Opuzen -  Klek

: Neum

: Zaton Doli - Dubrovnik (start of concurrency with ) - Karasovići
 
: Debeli Brijeg - Petrovac na Moru (start of concurrency with ) - Sutomore (end of concurrency with )
: Sutomore - Virpazar
: Virpazar - Podgorica - Ribarevina
: Ribarevina - Berane - Dračenovac

: Špiljani - Ribariće
: Ribariće - Vitkoviće

: Bërnjak - Mitrovica - Pristina (end of concurrency with )
: Pristina - Elez Han

 A4: Blace - Skopje (Towards )
 A2: Skopje (Towards ) - Ohrid
 A3: Ohrid - Medžitlija

: Niki - Florina - Ptolemaida
: Ptolemaida - Kozani
: Kozani - Larissa - Domokos - Lamia
: Lamia - Thermopylae
: Thermopylae - Bralos
: Bralos - Patras
: Patras
: Patras - Kórinthos
: Kórinthos - Tripoli - Meligalas - Kalamata
: Kalamata
 Kalamata - Kissamos
: Kissamos - Chania
: Chania

Formerly, before 1985, this was the E14.

Notes

References

External links 
 UN Economic Commission for Europe: Overall Map of E-road Network (2007)

65
E065
E065
E065
E065
E065
E065
E065
E065
E065
E065
E065
E065
E065